Alistair Frost (born 24 April 1999) is a Zimbabwean cricketer. In November 2017, Frost was named to Zimbabwe's squad for the 2018 Under-19 Cricket World Cup. After the tournament he moved to Ireland, where he made his Twenty20 debut on 25 June 2021, for Munster Reds in the 2021 Inter-Provincial Trophy. He made his List A debut on 30 June 2021, for Munster Reds in the 2021 Inter-Provincial Cup. He was named in an Ireland Academy squads to play England U-19s and the Free Foresters.

References

External links
 

1999 births
Living people
Irish cricketers
Zimbabwean cricketers
Place of birth missing (living people)
Munster Reds cricketers